"Stop the World" is a song from American rock band Extreme's third studio album, III Sides to Every Story. It was released as the second single from the album in November 1992. It charted in the United Kingdom, where it peaked at number 22. The music video features the late model Kadamba Simmons running away from a man pursuing her.

Track listing
 "Stop The World" (radio edit) – 4:38
 "Christmas Time Again"
 "Warheads" – 5:18
 "Don't Leave Me Alone" – 5:44

References

1992 singles
1992 songs
A&M Records singles
Extreme (band) songs
Songs written by Gary Cherone
Songs written by Nuno Bettencourt